County State-Aid Highway 42 (CSAH 42), usually called County Road 42 (CR 42), is a  county highway in Dakota and Scott counties in the southeastern part of the U.S. state of Minnesota. It is a primary arterial highway in the two counties. These two counties form the southernmost portion of the 13-county Twin Cities metropolitan area, although CSAH 42 travels across the northern reaches of the two counties.

Route description
County Road 42 serves as an east–west arterial route for the South of the River suburbs of the Minneapolis – Saint Paul area.  The roadway connects the communities of Shakopee, Prior Lake, Savage, Burnsville, Apple Valley, Rosemount, and Hastings; which are all located south of the Minnesota River.

From west to east, the route follows 140th Street, Egan Drive, 150th Street and 145th Street.  Its westernmost terminus is at Shakopee in Scott County, where it intersects County Road 17 (Marschall Road).  The eastern terminus of County 42 is at Hastings in Dakota County, where it meets U.S. Highway 61.

County 42 is designated as a principal arterial highway by the Metropolitan Council, and the roadway is supposed to have limited commercial access and traffic signals only at one-half mile intervals.  However, because it was used as a primary commercial road before its designation as a principal arterial highway, it passes directly through the downtown areas of several cities in Scott and Dakota Counties; most notably Burnsville and Apple Valley in Dakota County

Most of County Road 42 is designated as part of the National Highway System.  The major highways it intersects from west to east are: State Highway 13, Interstate 35W, Interstate 35E, Cedar Avenue two miles (3 km) south of the terminus of State Highway 77, State Highway 3, U.S. 52, State Highway 55, and U.S. 61.

History
County Road 42 was authorized and paved during the 1960s.

In July 2007, construction began to widen County Road 42 to six lanes from Glendale Road in Savage to County Road 5 in Burnsville. Also, the old traffic signals between Glendale Road and County Road 5, were replaced with new ones. The project was completed by summer 2008.

Future
A proposed reconstruction project at the interchange with U.S. Highway 52 in Rosemount, will reconstruct the interchange to a cloverleaf interchange. The purpose of the project is to provide movement between the north and the east with the closure of the nearby US 52 / MN 55 interchange. Phase 1 of construction will start in 2017, with widening of County Road 42 to 4 lanes, including turn lanes and replacement of Highway 52 bridges.

Major Intersections

References

042
042